Sinopieris dubernardi, or Oberthür's white, is a species of butterfly in the family Pieridae. It is treated as a member of the genus Sinopieris, or alternately, the genus Pontia. It is found in China, where it inhabits grassland plateaus and mountainsides at elevations above 2,000 meters.

Subspecies
Sinopieris dubernardi has a number of subspecies:
S. d. bromkampi (O. Bang-Haas, 1938) (China: Gansu)
S. d. chumbiensis (de Nicéville, 1897) (southern Tibet)
S. d. dubernardi (China: northern Yunnan, western Sichuan)
S. d. gyantsenisis (Verity, 1911) (southern Tibet)
S. d. kozlovi (Alphéraky, 1897) (China: Nanshan)
S. d. pomiensis (Yoshino, 1998) (eastern Tibet)
S. d. rothschildi (Verity, 1911) (China: Shaanxi)
S. d. wangi Huang, 1998 (south-eastern Tibet)

References

Pierini
Butterflies described in 1884
Butterflies of Asia
Fauna of Tibet
Taxa named by Charles Oberthür